The 12029/30 New Delhi Amritsar Swarna Shatabdi Express is a Superfast Express train of the Shatabdi category belonging to Indian Railways - Northern Railway zone that runs between New Delhi and Amritsar in India.

It operates as train number 12029 from New Delhi to Amritsar Junction and as train number 12030 in the reverse direction serving the states of Delhi, Haryana & Punjab.

Coaches

The 12029 / 30 New Delhi Amritsar Swarna Shatabdi Express has 3 Executive Class, 14 AC Chair Car & 2 End on Generator coaches. It does not carry a Pantry car coach but being a Shatabdi category train catering is arranged on board the train.

As is customary with most train services in India, Coach Composition may be amended at the discretion of Indian Railways depending on demand.

Service

The 12029 New Delhi Amritsar Swarna Shatabdi Express covers the distance of 448 kilometres in 6 hours 20 mins (71.68 km/hr) & in 6 hours 15 mins as 12030 Amritsar New Delhi Swarna Shatabdi Express (72.65 km/hr).

As the average speed of the train is above , as per Indian Railways rules, its fare includes a superfast surcharge.

Speed
The maximum permissible speed is 130 kmph between New Delhi and Ludhiana. Increasing of maximum permissible speed from 110 to kmph to 130 kmph is under process between Ludhiana and Amritsar.

Routing

The 12029 / 30 New Delhi Amritsar Swarna Shatabdi Express runs from New Delhi via Ambala Cantonment, Rajpura Junction, Ludhiana Junction, Phagwara Junction, Jalandhar City, Beas Junction to Amritsar Junction.

Traction

As the entire route is fully electrified, a Ghaziabad based WAP 5 or WAP 7 powers the train for its entire journey.

Arrest

On 16 March 2017, the train was arrested by a court order.

Timings

References 

 http://www.indianrail.gov.in/shatabdi_trn_list.html
 http://archive.indianexpress.com/news/swarna-shatabdi-palace-on-wheels-to-soon-get-vacuum-toilets/1196017/
 https://www.hindustantimes.com/punjab/two-months-on-attached-swarna-shatabdi-finally-released-by-court/story-RC22aMWaiwnYzB9rNu296N.html

External links

Shatabdi Express trains
Rail transport in Delhi
Rail transport in Haryana
Rail transport in Punjab, India
Transport in Delhi
Transport in Amritsar